The Unprocessed Child: Living Without School by Valerie Fitzenreiter is a book about how Fitzenreiter raised her daughter, Laurie Chancey, using a combination of unschooling and attachment parenting.  The author's philosophy of parenting is based mainly on the works of John Caldwell Holt and A.S. Neill, combined with her own instincts.  The book is organized by topic and includes Fitzenreiter's thoughts and personal anecdotes on socialization, parental responsibility, self-discipline, chores, bedtimes, sex and dating, and many others.  She offers her daughter's success in life as evidence that unschooling is a viable way to raise children.

External links
 Unbounded Publications - publisher of The Unprocessed Child
 Laurie Chancey's personal website

2003 non-fiction books
Books about parenting